Elections were held in the organized municipalities in the Kenora District of Ontario on October 24, 2022 in conjunction with municipal elections across the province.

Dryden
Incumbent mayor Greg Wilson did not run for re-election. City councillor Shayne MacKinnon ran for mayor against Jack B. Harrison.

Ear Falls
Kevin Kahoot was re-elected by acclamation as mayor of Ear Falls.

Ignace
The following were the results for mayor of Ignace.

Kenora
Mayor Dan Reynard originally announced he would be running for re-election. However, he later announced he would not. 

The following were the results for mayor of Kenora.

Machin
The following were the results for mayor of Machin.

Pickle Lake
The following were the results for mayor of Pickle Lake.

Red Lake
The following were the results for mayor of Red Lake.

Sioux Lookout
Doug Lawrence was acclaimed as mayor of Sioux Lookout.

Sioux Narrows-Nestor Falls
Gale Black was acclaimed as mayor of Sioux Narrows-Nestor Falls.

References

Kenora
Kenora District